Muslim Youth League, abbreviated as the Youth League, is the youth wing of the Indian Union Muslim League.

Sayyid Munavvar Ali Shihab Thangal and P. K. Firos currently serves as the Kerala State President and General Secretary, Youth League, respectively.

National office bearers

Muslim Youth League Kerala State Committee

Office bearers of Kerala State Committee

Former office bearers of Kerala State Committee

References

Youth wings of political parties in India
Indian Union Muslim League
1973 establishments in Tamil Nadu
Organizations established in 1973
Volunteer organisations in India
Youth wings of conservative parties